Vauxhall is an inner city district of Liverpool, Merseyside, England. It is located north of Liverpool city centre, and is bounded by Kirkdale in the north, and Everton in the east, with the docks and River Mersey running along the west side.

Vauxhall is in the Liverpool City Council ward of Kirkdale and the edge of the Central, Liverpool ward, although previously it was a ward itself. In the 1841 Liverpool Census the area was covered by two wards Scotland and Vauxhall. According to the 2001 Census, Vauxhall had a population of 6,699.

Description
The Vauxhall area is more famously known as the "Scottie Road area" due to the history of Scotland Road running through it. The Scottie Press is a well known local newspaper for the Vauxhall area and is recognised as "Britain's longest running community newspaper". In 2008 Liverpool celebrated being European Capital of Culture, and in June 2008 to make a point of the area's contribution to Liverpool is not forgotten amid all the cultural celebrations, the Scottie Roaders, old and new, held their own 08 party.

Despite the area being widely known and historical, the Vauxhall area is often misrepresented by the media as Kirkdale or Everton. Liverpool City Council's haste to update district signs around 2005 has also meant the entire area was formally misrepresented by signs saying "Everton", although these signs no longer remain around Vauxhall.

The south end of Vauxhall near the city centre is home to Liverpool John Moores University at Byrom Street. This location like so much of Liverpool's inner city is much changed compared to yesteryear. Also nearby is Atlantic Point and Marybone halls of residence.

History
Scotland Road was created in the 1770s as a turnpike road to Preston via Walton and Burscough. It became part of a stagecoach route to Scotland, hence its name. It was partly widened in 1803 and streets of working-class housing laid out either side as Liverpool expanded. Many were demolished as slums in the 1930s, to be replaced with corporation flats. In the mid-19th century as destitute, starving Irish immigrants flooded into the area particularly during the Great Famine, Scotland Road had become densely overcrowded, this with people living in courts and cellars in appalling conditions with poverty and sickness worse than anywhere in the country. Eldon Grove (now Grade II listed) was built as model housing as part of a labourers' village and was officially opened by the Countess of Derby in 1912.

In Victorian times the area had over 200 public houses, mostly now gone. What is now Vauxhall was historically within the boundaries of old Liverpool before further expansion took in the nearby townships of Everton (1835) and Kirkdale (1860s).

Scotland Road was the centre of working class life in north Liverpool. Home to most of Liverpool's migrant communities, Scotland Road was almost "a city within a city but by far the largest community was Irish Catholic following a massive influx of refugees fleeing the famine of 1847/48 It was a place close to both the back end of the city centre and the docks. It could be a place of both romantic nostalgia and brutal hardship. Community was at the centre of Scotland Road and a shared distinctly Liverpool -Irish identity evolved through the nineteenth and early twentieth century.

Urban clearance and the construction of the Wallasey Tunnel in the 1960s and '70s led to a shift in population of the area to various parts of the city such as Kirkby, Croxteth, Norris Green, Fazakerley, Huyton, Stockbridge Village to new modern housing, leaving Scotland Road in a state of steady decline. Demolition particularly around the north end of Scotland Road continued in the 1980s and beyond.

New housing
2008 marked 30 years since a new housing estate breathed life into derelict land to the west of Vauxhall Road called Eldonian Village. In recent years new housing has followed this flagship Eldonian Village, such as Athol Village alongside the Leeds and Liverpool Canal plus flats and student accommodation around the Leeds Street and Marybone end to improve the Vauxhall area, however little of Scotland Road itself remains.

Plans were unveiled in March 2018 to restore the three blocks of Eldon Grove back into use as housing after them being derelict for over 16 years. The plans also include the creation of a new block of flats on adjacent land.

Political history
The area has been contained in the following parliamentary constituencies:
 Liverpool Scotland (1885–1974)
 Liverpool Scotland Exchange (1974–83)
 Liverpool Kirkdale (1983–present)

The Members of Parliament (MPs) for the area since 1885 have been as follows:

The election results for the Vauxhall ward of Liverpool City Council can be found via:
 Liverpool City Council elections, 1880–present
 Liverpool Town Council elections, 1835–1879

Landmarks in Vauxhall

Much of the area's landmarks have long since been demolished or closed. Some existing landmarks are:

 St Anthony's Church
 St Sylvester's Church
 Stanley Dock
 Tobacco Warehouse
 Eldon Grove, off Limekiln Lane.
 Throstles Nest (public house next to St Anthony's Church)

The North Liverpool Community Justice Centre (CJC) was based in Boundary Street in a former school.

For the future, Peel Holdings have proposed a plan for the docks in Vauxhall called Liverpool Waters. However it is reported this development would take decades to complete.

Education

There were many schools in the "Scottie Road" area, however with a decline in population, and rather like pubs and churches, few remain:

 Holy Cross & St Mary's Catholic primary school
 The Trinity Catholic primary school

Notable residents

 Cilla Black
 Tom Baker
 Bobby Campbell
 Laurie Carberry
 James William Carling
 Tommy Comerford
 Nancy Flanagan
 Thomas Cecil Gray
 Jackie Hamilton
 John Hines (Australian soldier)
 David Logan
 Jimmy Melia
 Johnny Morrissey
 James Nugent
 Robert Parry (MP)
 Father Tom Williams

References

External links

 Liverpool Street Gallery - Liverpool 3 (Vauxhall)
 Liverpool Street Gallery - Liverpool 5 (Vauxhall)
 Scottie Press
 Vauxhall Neighbourhood Council
 The Silvestrian Suites
 
 Books of old Liverpool
 Images of Vauxhall

Areas of Liverpool
Irish diaspora in England